This is a list of years in Dutch television.

Twenty-first century

Twentieth century

See also 
 List of years in the Netherlands
 List of Dutch films
 List of years in television

Television
Television in the Netherlands by year
Dutch television